My Secret App is a Singaporean Chinese drama series which is telecast on Singapore's free-to-air channel, Starhub TV. It stars Fann Wong, Darren Lim, Eelyn Kok  & Hayley Woo as the main casts in the series. It is shown in 都会 Channel.

Casts

Trivia
 Roadshow were conducted at West Mall on 25 May 2015.Appearing Casts were Damien Teo, Fann Wong, Darren Lim & Hayley Woo.

Singaporean television series